Maurice Dennis (1913–1962) was an amateur and professional boxer from Camden Town, England. He boxed between 1938 and 1940 an had 14 professional contests.

Biography
Dennis won the 1937 Amateur Boxing Association British middleweight title, when boxing out of the Northampton Polytechnic ABC.

He was a silver medalist in boxing at the 1938 British Empire Games. Denis Reardon, the first boxing gold medalist from Wales at the British Empire Games (now the Commonwealth Games) defeated Maurice Dennis in the middleweight final at the 1938 Sydney games.

He was a totalisator mechanic by trade.

References

English male boxers
1913 births
1962 deaths
People from Camden Town
Boxers from Greater London
Boxers at the 1938 British Empire Games
Commonwealth Games silver medallists for England
Commonwealth Games medallists in boxing
Middleweight boxers
Medallists at the 1938 British Empire Games